Andrew David Putnam (born January 25, 1989) is an American professional golfer on the PGA Tour.

Early years
Born and raised in Tacoma, Washington, Putnam graduated high school in 2007 from Life Christian Academy. His older brother Michael has also played on the PGA Tour.

Putnam played college golf in southern California at Pepperdine University in Malibu from 2007 to 2011. He won two tournaments and was a three time All-American.

Career

2011–2017
Putnam turned professional in 2011, and he played on the eGolf Professional Tour in 2012. He first played on the Web.com Tour in 2013 and was 49th on the money list, not enough to earning a PGA Tour card. Putnam won for the first time as a professional in April 2014 at the WNB Golf Classic on the Web.com Tour. He made his PGA Tour debut at the Shell Houston Open in 2014, where he played in the same tournament as Michael, but missed the cut. Putnam finished eighth in the Web.com Tour Finals that year to earn his PGA Tour card for the 2014–15 season.

In the 2014-15 PGA Tour Season Putnam missed the cut in 13 out of 23 events. He finished 192nd in the season-long FedEx Cup and lost his tour card, returning to the Web.com Tour for the 2016 season.

In the 2016 Web.com Tour season he finished 41st on the money list and won $125,981, this was not enough to earn a PGA Tour card. In the 2017 Web.com Tour Putnam won $266,296 and finished 8th in the regular season. He also won the Panama Claro Championship in February 2017. He regained his PGA Tour card for the 2017-18 PGA Tour Season.

2017–18 PGA Tour season
Putnam gained his first PGA Tour win in August 2018 at the Barracuda Championship, an alternate event near Reno, Nevada. He finished the 2017-18 PGA Tour Season with 5 Top 10s and earned $2,387,382. He finished 35th in the season-long FedEx Cup.

2018–19 PGA Tour season
On October 28, 2018, Putnam tied for 4th in the WGC-HSBC Champions tournament in China, earning $393,000.

Amateur wins
2010 Pacific Coast Amateur

Professional wins (3)

PGA Tour wins (1)

Web.com Tour wins (2)

*Note: The 2014 WNB Golf Classic was shortened to 54 holes due to strong winds.

Web.com Tour playoff record (1–0)

Results in major championships
Results not in chronological order in 2020.

CUT = missed the half-way cut
WD = withdrew
"T" indicates a tie for a place
NT = No tournament due to COVID-19 pandemic

Results in The Players Championship

CUT = missed the halfway cut
C = Canceled after the first round due to the COVID-19 pandemic

Results in World Golf Championships

 

"T" = Tied

See also
2014 Web.com Tour Finals graduates
2017 Web.com Tour Finals graduates

References

External links

Pepperdine University Athletics – Andrew Putnam

American male golfers
Pepperdine Waves men's golfers
PGA Tour golfers
Korn Ferry Tour graduates
Golfers from Washington (state)
Sportspeople from Tacoma, Washington
1989 births
Living people